The Arthromygalidae are an extinct family of arachnids, possibly spiders. Fossils placed in the family were all found in the Carboniferous, . They were considered by Alexander Petrunkevitch to be "mesotheles", i.e. placed in the spider suborder Mesothelae. Petrunkevitch used the family for Carboniferous fossils he regarded as mesotheles but which lacked eyes (those with eyes were placed in the Arthrolycosidae). Paul A. Selden has shown the fossil specimens only have "the general appearance of spiders", with segmented abdomens (opisthosomae), but no definite spinnerets.

Genera
Genera placed in the Arthromygalidae  are shown below, together with the location of the fossils.

 †Arthromygale Petrunkevitch, 1923 – Rakovník (Czech Republic)
 †Eolycosa Kušta, 1885 – Rakovník
 †Geralycosa Kušta, 1888 – Rakovník
 †Kustaria Petrunkevitch, 1953 – Rakovník
 †Palaranea Frič, 1873 – Czech Republic
 †Protocteniza Petrunkevitch, 1949 – Coseley (England)
 †Protolycosa Roemer, 1865 – Silesia, Cévennes (France)
 †Rakovnicia Kušta, 1884 – Rakovník

References 

Paleozoic arachnids
†
Taxa named by Alexander Petrunkevitch